National Assembly Station is a railway station on Line 9 of the Seoul Subway.

The name of this station comes from the nearby National Assembly Building, where the National Assembly of South Korea meets.

Station layout

Places of interest
 National Assembly of South Korea, KBS Open Hall, KBS Building

Railway stations opened in 2009
Seoul Metropolitan Subway stations
Yeouido
Metro stations in Yeongdeungpo District